Chelsea Angelo (born 2 June 1996, in Melbourne) is a racing driver from Australia. She currently competes in TCR Australia having previously contested the V8 Supercars Development Series.

She attempted to qualify for the 2019 W Series, however was rejected following the evaluation tests.

Racing record

Career summary

References

External links

 Profile at Driver Database

1996 births
Living people
Australian Formula 3 Championship drivers
Australian female racing drivers
Racing drivers from Melbourne

Garry Rogers Motorsport drivers
Kelly Racing drivers